Laragne-Montéglin is a commune in the Hautes-Alpes department in southeastern France.

Geography

Climate
Laragne-Montéglin has a mediterranean climate (Köppen climate classification Csa).

Population

See also
Communes of the Hautes-Alpes department

References

Communes of Hautes-Alpes